Rosie Nix Adams (born Rozanna Lea Nix; July 13, 1958 – October 24, 2003) was an American singer. She was the daughter of June Carter Cash and her second husband, Edwin "Rip" Nix, and the stepdaughter of the country music legend Johnny Cash.

Early life 
Nix-Adams was the daughter of June Carter Cash and her second husband Edwin "Rip" Nix. She later became the stepdaughter of Johnny Cash when her mother remarried. Her first name was spelled as both "Rosie" and "Rosey", according to stepsister Rosanne Cash. Nix-Adams grew up with six siblings.

Career 
Nix-Adams performed as a backup singer for her stepfather's The Johnny Cash Show, David Grey, and Slim Whitman. She was also a semi-regular performing member of the Carter Family. She performed a duet with Cash on his 1974 single "Father and Daughter" (a remake of the Cat Stevens song "Father and Son") from the album The Junkie and the Juicehead Minus Me.

Personal life and death 
Nix married Philip Adams.{Feb 8th 2000} She and bluegrass musician Jimmy Campbell were found dead on a bus in Montgomery County, Tennessee, on October 24, 2003. The deaths were initially called "suspicious" by law enforcement authorities but were subsequently ruled to be accidental, caused by carbon monoxide from a propane space heater, used without ventilation, in the bus. Nix-Adams was 45 years old. She was buried near her mother and stepfather (who had both died earlier that year) in the Hendersonville Memory Gardens in Hendersonville, Tennessee.

References

External links

1958 births
2003 deaths
Deaths from carbon monoxide poisoning
Accidental deaths in Tennessee
Cash–Carter family
American women country singers
American country singer-songwriters
20th-century American women
21st-century American women